Rogelio Frigerio (born January 7, 1970, Buenos Aires) is an Argentine economist and politician. He was Minister of Interior, Public Works and Housing during Mauricio Macri's administration. Since 2021 legislative election, Frigerio has been a National Deputy elected in the Juntos por el Cambio list in Entre Ríos.

He is the son of Octavio Frigerio, an agricultural engineer and politician, and Sisi Adam, expert on psychophysical re-education and body language. In 2011 he was elected Legislator of the City of Buenos Aires for Republican Proposal. Between 2013 and 2015 he served as President of the Bank of the City of Buenos Aires.

His grandfather was Rogelio Julio Frigerio, an important journalist and politician, who was a founding member of both Intransigent Radical Civic Union (Spanish: Unión Cívica Radical Intransigente, UCRI) and Integration and Development Movement (Spanish: Movimiento de Integración y Desarrollo, MID). He was also the Secretary of Socio-economic Relations at Arturo Frondizi's administration (1958-1962). He is considered to be one of the most important people in the history of Argentina's political thought: he was the main driving force behind the theory of developmentalism in this country. As his grandfather, Rogelio Frigerio supports developmentalism, and is one of the main figures of the Integration and Development Movement.

Training and education
Rogelio Frigerio received his secondary studies at Goethe Schule school and holds a degree in Business Administration from the University of Buenos Aires with a major in Planning and Economic Development (1994).

In 1985, when he was only 15 years old, Frigerio decided to take part in the Integration and Development Movement (MID) activities as a prelude to his future political career.

Throughout his life he had two great educational influences from his parents: a strong political tradition, and a commitment to dialogue and to consider all the issues as a whole (holistic vision).

Politics
His career in the public sector began during the government of President Carlos Menem, in 1998 - at the age of 28 - was appointed for a year Secretary of Economic Programming of Roque Fernández, the Minister of Economy of the Argentine Nation during the second presidency of Menem between 1995 and 1999.

In 1996 he was Undersecretary of Regional Programming.1 Between 1997 and 1999 he served as president of the Trust Fund for Provincial Development. From 1996 to 2000, he was Director of Postgraduate Business Policy at the University of Salvador1 and holder of the Permanent Forum of Budget Directorates. He founded and directed until 2011 the consultant Economy & Regions.

He is also president of Federar (Foundation for Economic and Regional Development Studies in Argentina). He was the head of the Argentine Association for the Evaluation of Projects and the Studies Foundation for the Economic and Regional Development of Argentina. It was also Advisor of the OKITA Foundation and co-founder and president of the Argentine Evaluation Association.

In 2011 he was elected Legislator of the Autonomous City of Buenos Aires by the Republican Proposal (PRO), and chaired the Budget, Finance, Tax Administration and Taxation Commission of the Legislature of the Autonomous City of Buenos Aires. He became President of Bank of the City of Buenos Aires in 2013.

Mauricio Macri, elected President of Argentina in 2015, nominated him to be his Minister of Interior Affairs, Public Works and Housing.

Minister of Interior, Public Works and Housing
An infrastructure plan was launched that carried out more than 5,800 works; the incorporation of more than 800 thousand people to the drinking water network and 1.5 million to the sewer network; the doubling of the installed capacity for the treatment of sewage liquids with the completion of 20 treatment plants and the commissioning of 20 more; the completion of 140 works to prevent flooding and protect more than 1.4 million people and 3 million productive hectares; the urbanization of 100 vulnerable neighborhoods; a 600% increase in investment in habitat improvement; the granting of more than 130,000 mortgage loans; the realization of 303 works in electrical networks throughout the country.

Among the most relevant works, the Matanza Riachuelo System stands out, which will benefit more than 4.5 million residents of the Metropolitan Area and will have demanded an investment of 1,200 million dollars, financed by the World Bank.

At the same time, an agenda focused on strengthening and improving transparency indices was promoted. For the first time, bidding documents for public works began to be published online, which had an impact on greater participation of companies and, consequently, on the lowering of the costs of the works. Also, a new objective, public and transparent allocation system for social housing called SiGeBe was developed. A national and federal registry with unified criteria for the selection of beneficiaries with which different levels of the State and NGOs can validate the demand for housing and future awards that are made throughout the country.

The Ministry of Interior, Public Works and Housing, began a process to provide autonomy to the provinces by restoring resources and moving towards the strengthening of subnational governments. In that sense, Frigerio reached essential agreements in order to implement regulations to promote a new resource distribution scheme to strengthen federalism. Along these lines, he promoted the signing of the Fiscal Consensus that reimbursed to 22 provinces the 15% of Co-participation that the Nation had withheld since 1992. Also, the increase in direct transfers of resources to the provinces that passed 40% of the federal collection in 2015 to 49.8% in 2019. This helped the fiscal situation improve significantly: by 2015 only eight provinces showed a positive financial result. Three years later, 18 provinces exhibited surpluses.

From an institutional point of view, an agenda focused on increasing levels of transparency, electoral equity and strengthening institutions was defined. In that sense, progress was made in the adoption of fundamental laws such as Law on Access to Public Information; Law on the financing of political parties; Mandatory Presidential Debate Law; Parity Law on lists; Presidential Transition Law (half penalty) and Interest Management Regulation Law (half penalty). The approval of decrees to increase the democratization of political representation was promoted, such as Presidential Decree 259/2019 which eliminated the possibility of the so-called “collecting lists”.

Frigerio participated and presented the Argentine position in the following conferences: United Nations Conference on Housing and Sustainable Urban Development Habitat III; 58th Annual Meeting of the Board of Governors of the Inter-American Development Bank (IDB) and the 32nd Annual Meeting of the Board of Governors of the Inter-American Investment Corporation (IIC); Business Forum “Intelligent Integration with the World: Promoting Regional Economies and Infrastructure Investment”; III Ibero-American Forum of Mayors, within the framework of the Annual Meeting of the Board of Governors of the IDB; High-Level Meeting “Integrity for good governance in Latin America and the Caribbean: from commitments to actions (OECD); China-Latin America and Caribbean Investment Exchange (CLACIE) Meeting, Beijing, China; XXII China-LAC Business Summit, Zhuhai.

Personal life
He is married to the lawyer Victoria Costoya with whom he has two children called Máximo and Delfina.

References

1970 births
Living people
Argentine people of Italian descent
Ministers of Internal Affairs of Argentina
Argentine economists
Republican Proposal politicians
Argentine political people
University of Buenos Aires alumni